Luis Alejandro García Barrera (born 26 February 1961) is a Mexican former footballer who played at both professional and international levels as a goalkeeper.

Club career
Born in Monterrey, García played professionally for Deportivo Neza, Club América, Irapuato and Puebla. He began his career with Deportivo Neza in the 1986–87 season, moving to América the next year.

International career
García also represented Mexico at international level, earning a total of 5 caps. All of them were during 1993, beginning with a 2–0 victory over Romania on February 10, 1993. He also made three appearances during the 1993 CONCACAF Gold Cup, in each case coming on as a second-half substitute for a field player to enable starting keeper Jorge Campos to play as a forward in decisive Mexican victories.

References

External links

1961 births
Living people
Footballers from Nuevo León
Sportspeople from Monterrey
Association football goalkeepers
Mexican footballers
Mexico under-20 international footballers
Mexico international footballers
1993 Copa América players
1993 CONCACAF Gold Cup players
CONCACAF Gold Cup-winning players
Coyotes Neza footballers
Club América footballers
Irapuato F.C. footballers
Club Puebla players
Liga MX players